The University of Toledo Collegian is a student newspaper published in Toledo, Ohio, serving the University of Toledo community.

Early history 
The Independent Collegian was first published in 1919 as The Universi-Teaser. It was renamed The Campus Collegian three years later. In 1962, it was renamed The Collegian
Copies of the papers are digitally archived at the University of Toledo library site.

Competition and color 
In early 1993, two former Collegian editors started a rival publication, Spectrum,
which was published in full color.
At the time, The Collegian was a published in black-and-white, with occasional spot color runs for special occasions such as Valentine's Day.
In response, The Collegian switched to full-color publication on September 20, 1993, although the news that The Collegian was planning to do so was first published in August by Spectrum, rather than by The Collegian itself.

Independence 
In 2000, after a long history as a student organization sponsored by the University of Toledo's Dean of Students Office, the editorial staff sought independence. This allowed the paper to keep and use its ad-sales revenue. The newspaper began operation as a 501(c)(3) nonprofit corporation, the Collegian Media Foundation.  The offices moved from the Student Union to off-campus headquarters, and the paper was renamed The Independent Collegian. 

In the fall of 2012, the newspaper moved back on campus to a suite in Carlson Library.

Return to University Affiliation

On October 29, 2019, the editorial staff announced a return to university sponsorship, a move to an all digital platform, and a name change: UToledo Collegian.

References 

Student newspapers published in Ohio
University of Toledo
Publications established in 1919
1919 establishments in Ohio